Beverly Mould (born 13 March  1962) is a South African former tennis player who was active in the first half of the 1980s.

Tennis career

During her career, Mould won three WTA Tour doubles titles.

Her best singles result at a Grand Slam tournament was reaching the third round at the 1983 French Open and 1984 US Open, losing to Andrea Jaeger and Wendy Turnbull respectively.

Mould achieved a highest singles ranking of No. 46 on 24 December 1984.

Career finals

Doubles (3 titles, 3 runner-ups)

Notes

References

External links
 
 

South African female tennis players
1962 births
Living people
People from Ladysmith, KwaZulu-Natal
White South African people